Rivne International Airport  is an airport in Rivne, Ukraine. Recently LOT Polish Airlines has been in talks with the consideration of opening a Warsaw route after Bravo Airways ended flights.

Airlines and destinations
As of July 2020, there are no regular scheduled services at the airport.

Statistics

See also
 List of airports in Ukraine
 List of the busiest airports in Ukraine
 List of the busiest airports in Europe
 List of the busiest airports in the former USSR

References

External links
 Official website
 NOAA/NWS current weather observations
 ASN Accident history for UKLR

Airports in Ukraine